Alfredo Damián Mendoza Sulewski (born 12 December 1963 in Encarnación) is a retired football striker from Paraguay. A player of Cerro Porteño he was a member of the national team that competed at the 1986 FIFA World Cup in Mexico. At the club level he also played for Olimpia Asunción, Mandiyú and Newell's Old Boys of Argentina and Club Atlas of Mexico.

Career
Born in Encarnación, Paraguay, Mendoza began playing football in local Club Silvio Pettirossi's youth system. He moved to Asunción, where he briefly played senior football with Club Atlético Tembetary and Club Guaraní, before signing with Cerro Porteño.

In 1986, Mendoza moved to Colombia where he would play for Independiente Medellín and Deportivo Cali. After spells with local side Club Olimpia and France's Stade Brestois 29, he spent most of the remainder of his career in Argentina with Textil Mandiyú and Newell's Old Boys.

References

 
 playerhistory

1963 births
Living people
People from Encarnación, Paraguay
Paraguayan footballers
Paraguayan expatriate footballers
Paraguay international footballers
Paraguayan people of Polish descent
Independiente Medellín footballers
Deportivo Cali footballers
Club Guaraní players
Cerro Porteño players
Club Olimpia footballers
Atlas F.C. footballers
Deportivo Mandiyú footballers
Newell's Old Boys footballers
Stade Brestois 29 players
Paraguayan Primera División players
Argentine Primera División players
Categoría Primera A players
Liga MX players
Ligue 1 players
Expatriate footballers in Argentina
Expatriate footballers in Colombia
Expatriate footballers in France
Expatriate footballers in Mexico
Paraguayan expatriate sportspeople in Argentina
Paraguayan expatriate sportspeople in Colombia
Paraguayan expatriate sportspeople in France
Paraguayan expatriate sportspeople in Mexico
Association football forwards
1986 FIFA World Cup players
1983 Copa América players
1989 Copa América players